Garth was a comic strip in the British newspaper Daily Mirror that ran from 24 July 1943 – 22 March 1997. It belonged to the action-adventure genre and followed the exploits of the title character, an immensely strong hero who battled various villains throughout the world and in different eras. It was widely syndicated in English-speaking countries. 1960s Australian fast bowler Garth McKenzie was nicknamed after its hero. Book collections of the strip were first published in 2011.

Publication history
Steve Dowling and Gordon Boshell were the originators of the Garth character. Dowling wanted to create a British adventure comic strip and took inspiration from the American comic strips Superman, Flash Gordon and Terry and the Pirates. Dowling and Boshell hired 15-year-old John Allard to work on Garth, who stayed with the strip for its entire run. After 69 adventures, Dowling retired and handed Garth over to Allard, which he carried on until 1971, when Eagle comics' Dan Dare artist, Frank Bellamy, took over the art with Allard writing. Garth's longevity had been established by Don Freeman, who created almost every basic Garth plot on which it was built.

Peter O'Donnell, Jim Edgar, and Angus Allan also wrote extensively for the strip during its decades-long existence. Philip Harbottle, a leading Garth expert and collector of the strips, wrote several of the stories during the 1990s. Martin Asbury became Garth's artist after Frank Bellamy's death in 1976, drawing the strip and writing many of the stories until its final episode in 1997.

In 1993, Bill Storrie produced a dozen or so 60-page photocopied magazines titled The Gopherville Argus Special Edition No. 1 featuring Garth as a tribute to the writers and artists who had been involved with the strip. Most (if not all) Garth strips are now owned by Mirror.

As of 13 August 2008, "Garth" has reappeared on the website of the Daily Mirror, drawn by the artist Huw J. Davies.

Having successfully worked in the Media Entertainment industry and Printed Media for over three decades (including periods at Disney, Warner, and Fox), Davies believed that the re-imagined version could easily cross from the digital, back to the printed medium, and ultimately licensing to other media. This was discussed and the future of the character in print was agreed upon with a new ongoing daily strip in print being planned to run at the end of the second online story arc, King of New York. However, due to an untimely accident involving long-standing cartoon editor Ken Layson, with whom the agreement had been made, things became muddied and internal politics with the Mirrorpix licensing arm of the newspaper created issues that delayed and inevitably halted this decision.

Davies decided to honour the characters history and under the terms of his licence re-branded the character. Davies, tipping the hat to Don Freeman, longtime writer of the strip, gave Garth a surname in the graphic novel Captain Garth Freeman of the Armed Services. In 2010 this was launched under British publisher Markosia and was a success, selling out at comic stores and conventions as well as online. It was re-published in 2013 By Pummie Productions Ink, at first with its usual format and later with a new cover by Spider-Man artist and Stan Lee collaborator Andy Tong. It was repackaged with the Garth title in honour of the 70th anniversary of the character with all proceeds going to Help for Heroes.

In 2015, it was published again by Pummie Productions Ink, where the character starred alongside Sexton Blake, in the first of what was promised to be a series of comic books, under the Captain Garth Freeman of the Armed Services title. This again sold out.

Davies believes that the online revamp of the character was the catalyst for longtime fans of the character to push for a return of the hero and what ultimately led the newspaper and its licensing arm to re-colour the old strips and relaunch them in the paper.

Garth started a run of reprints in the Daily Mirror, coloured by Martin Baines, in the issue dated 21 February 2011.

Characters and story
Garth's time-travelling adventures lasted for over 54 years and covered 165 stories (plus two additional stories published in the Daily Mirror Book for Boys, 1970–71). In the backstory, Garth washed ashore in Shetland and was adopted by an elderly couple. Garth developed almost superhuman strength and eventually became a naval captain and all-round military genius. Garth travelled through many eras and confronted villains such as Madame Voss and Apollo. His true love was the ancient goddess-like figure, Astra. Garth's sidekick and mentor were French Professor Jules Lumiere, who psychoanalyzed the hero and recovered memories of his previous experiences.

Episode list

Collected editions
Garth strips were reprinted as trade paperbacks on several occasions:

Garth in "The Last Goddess" and "Romeo Brown", Daily Mirror, c.1960
The Daily Mirror Book of Garth 1975, Fleetway Publications, 1975, 
The Daily Mirror Book of Garth 1976, Fleetway Publications, 1976
Garth Book One: "The Cloud of Balthus", Titan Books, 1984,  
Garth Book Two: "The Women of Galba", Titan Books, 1985, 
Garth ( Captain Garth freeman of the Armed Services ) 1st printing Markosia 2010    / 2nd Printing Pummie Productions 2013

Garth has only been reprinted sporadically in the UK, but in recent years the All Devon Comic Collectors Club was allowed to reprint episodes on a strictly for members only basis.

It was announced that Penguin Books India was to issue the Complete Garth in a collectible 5-volume hardback graphic novel box set. This would comprise all 16,000 strips covering the 165 stories published in the Daily Mirror on 3,000 plus pages. The Penguin India reprint would be an Indian subcontinent-only production and the tentative release date was set for September 2009. However, Penguin Books India has now confirmed that the publication of the set has been postponed indefinitely.

References

External links
Garth at the International Catalog of Superheroes
Garth at Downthetubes.net

Action-adventure comics
British comic strips
British comics characters
Drama comics
Adventure comics
Action comics
Comics about time travel
Nautical comics
1943 comics debuts
Comics characters introduced in 1943
1997 comics endings
Comics characters with superhuman strength
Fictional sea captains
Fictional castaways
Male characters in comics
Daily Mirror